Early Music History is a peer-reviewed academic journal published annually by Cambridge University Press, which specialises in the study of music from the early Middle Ages to the end of the 17th century. It was established in 1981 and is edited by Iain Fenlon.

References

Cambridge University Press academic journals
Music journals
Publications established in 1981
Annual journals
English-language journals